Salamina (from the Greek name Salamis) may refer to :

 Italian name of places and jurisdictions in Greece
 Salamis Island, an Aegean island near Athens
 Salamina (city), a port town on Salamis Island 
 Salamis, Cyprus, also named Constantia, former seat of a Metropolitan archbishopric, now double (Latin Catholic and Cypriot Orthodox) titular see

 Other places and jurisdictions
 Salamina, Caldas, a town and municipality in the Caldas Department, Colombia
 Salamina, Magdalena, a town and municipality in the Magdalena Department, Colombia

 Other uses
 Salamina, a memoir by Rockwell Kent about his first arctic winter in Illorsuit, Greenland.